The black-throated accentor (Prunella atrogularis) is a small passerine bird found in the Ural, Tian Shan and Altai Mountains. It is migratory, wintering in Afghanistan and neighboring countries. It is a rare vagrant in western  Europe.

The black-throated accentor builds a neat nest low in spruce thickets, laying 3-5 unspotted blue eggs. It winters in scrub or cultivation.

This is a dunnock-sized bird,  in length. It has a streaked dark brown back, somewhat resembling a house sparrow, but adults have a black crown, face patch and throat, and a white supercilium. The breast is orange, and the belly white with orange stripes. Like other accentors, this species has an insectivore's fine pointed bill.

Sexes are similar, but winter birds and juveniles are less contrasted. In particular, the dark throat may be almost absent in young birds.

The call is a fine ti-ti-ti, and the song is similar to the dunnock's pleasant twittering.

References

black-throated accentor
Birds of Central Asia
Ural Mountains
black-throated accentor